The women's discus throw event at the 2011 World Championships in Athletics was held at the Daegu Stadium on August 27 and 28.

Dani Samuels was the defending champion, but had not performed well prior to the event. Germany's Nadine Müller was the leader in the Diamond League, but it was Chinese thrower Li Yanfeng who held the best mark that season (67.98 m). Stephanie Brown Trafton entered as the reigning Olympic champion, while 2009 World medallists Yarelis Barrios and Nicoleta Grasu were other prominent competitors. Sandra Perković, the leading athlete earlier in the season, was absent due to a six-month ban for doping offences.

Nadine Müller had the best mark in the qualifying rounds, with her sole throw of 65.54 m to make the final. Li Yanfeng and Yarelys Barrios were the next best throwers in the first round. Dani Samuels narrowly avoided elimination, while Aretha Thurmond was among those to miss the final. In the final the following day, Li took the lead in the first round with a throw of 65.28 m and Müller followed her over the 65 m line into second place. Żaneta Glanc of Poland had an opening throw of 63.91 m, moving into third place. The top three remained unchanged after the second throw, although Li improved her lead to 66.52 m and Müller consolidated her second place with a mark of 65.97 m. Barrios of Cuba moved into third in the next round with her best mark of the competition (65.73 m) and defending champion Samuels was struck out in the final cut off. Brown Trafton threw her best (63.85 m) in round four, moving into fifth place, but the medal positions remained unchanged thereafter – Li won the gold medal, while Müller and Barrios took the silver and bronze medals, respectively.

Although Li had won gold medals in Asian-level competitions, it was the 32-year-old's first medal of any colour on the world stage. She credited her success to her work with German coach Karl-Heinz Steinmetz and increased seasonal competition against foreign athletes. Müller silver also represented her first medal at a global championships. For Barrios it was her fourth consecutive time on the major podium, having been runner-up at the two previous world championships and winner of the 2008 Olympic silver medal.

Medalists

Records
Prior to the competition, the established records were as follows.

Qualification standards

Schedule

Results

Qualification
Qualification: Qualifying Performance 62.00 (Q) or at least 12 best performers (q) advance to the final.

Final
Format: Each athlete has three attempts, then the eight best performers have three further attempts

References

External links
Discus throw results at IAAF website

Discus throw
Discus throw at the World Athletics Championships
2011 in women's athletics